USS Koka (AT-31) was a  in the service of the United States Navy. Previously named Oconee, she was renamed Koka on 24 February 1919. She was launched 11 July 1919 by the Puget Sound Naval Shipyard, and commissioned 18 February 1920.

Assigned to the 11th Naval District, Koka sailed from Puget Sound to San Diego, California in March 1920, and spent the next 17 years performing various tug and target-towing services out of San Diego.  One of its yearly duties, shared alternately with Navy Eagle boat 34 as related by Max Miller in his 1932 book I Cover The Waterfront, including taking a team to Guadalupe Island off Mexico to capture elephant seals for the San Diego Zoo. On 20 March 1934 she had the honor of towing  out of San Diego on the homeward leg of Constitution'''s 1930s tour of the United States.

On 7 December 1937 Koka ran aground off San Clemente Island and was officially decommissioned the same day. She was declared unsalvageable and abandoned as a wreck on 22 January 1938. Her name was struck from the Naval Register on 2 March 1938.

References

External links 
 history.navy.mil: USS Oconee
 
 Koka wreck diving information

Bagaduce-class fleet tugs
Ships built in Bremerton, Washington
1919 ships